Jonathan Erlich and Andy Ram were the defending champions, but lost in the semifinals.

Michaël Llodra and Fabrice Santoro won in the final 6–3, 6–1, against Jeff Coetzee and Rogier Wassen.

Seeds

Draw

Draw

External links
Main Draw

Doubles
2005 ATP Tour